The Two Doctors is the fourth serial of the 22nd season of the British science fiction television series Doctor Who, which was first broadcast in three weekly parts on BBC1 from 16 February to 2 March 1985.

The serial is set on an alien space station and in and around Seville. In the serial, the alien time traveller the Sixth Doctor (Colin Baker), his former travelling companion Jamie McCrimmon (Frazer Hines) and his current companion Peri Brown (Nicola Bryant) work to save the younger Second Doctor (Patrick Troughton) from the biogeneticist Dastari (Laurence Payne), who intends to steal the knowledge of how to travel in time from the Second Doctor's genetic make-up.

This serial marks Troughton's final appearance as the Second Doctor before his death in 1987.

Plot

The Second Doctor and Jamie McCrimmon land the TARDIS on board Space Station Camera in the Third Zone on a mission for the Time Lords, who have also installed a teleport control on the TARDIS. The Doctor explains that the station is a research facility and that they have to talk to Dastari, the Head of Projects. The Androgum cook Shockeye drugs the meals of the station's scientists. The Doctor tells Dastari that the Time Lords want the time experiments of Kartz and Reimer stopped. The Doctor warns that the distortions from the experiments are on the verge of threatening the fabric of time, but Dastari refuses to order them to cease, accusing the Time Lords of not wanting another race to discover the secrets of time travel. Dastari and the others collapse from the drugged meals. Chessene, an Androgum technologically augmented to mega-genius levels, lowers the station's defences to allow the Sontarans to attack. Jamie sees the Doctor appear to die by the Sontarans before fleeing.

In the TARDIS, the Sixth Doctor has a vision of his second incarnation being put to death. Since he is still alive, he is concerned that he may have died in the past and only exists now as a temporal anomaly. He decides to consult his old friend Dastari to see if he can help. The Doctor and Peri arrive on the station and find no signs of life. The station computer demands that the Doctor leave and, when he refuses, tries to kill him and Peri by depressurising the passageway. The Doctor opens a hatch and drags his unconscious companion through to another section. The Doctor discovers Dastari's day journal and the Time Lords' objections to the Kartz-Reimer experiments.

In Spain, Chessene, Shockeye and a Sontaran, Major Varl, take possession of a hacienda by killing its owner, Doña Arana. Dastari and the Sontaran Group Marshal Stike carry an unconscious Second Doctor towards the hacienda.

Peri is attacked by a humanoid in rags. The Sixth Doctor and Peri find that Peri's attacker was Jamie, who has been hiding all the while. Under hypnosis, Jamie tells the Sixth Doctor that the Sontarans killed the Second Doctor. The Sixth Doctor explains to Jamie and Peri that what Jamie saw was an illusion designed to make people believe the Doctor was dead and not investigate further. He theorises that the Sontarans also kidnapped Dastari as he is the only biogeneticist in the galaxy who could isolate the symbiotic nuclei that gives Time Lords the molecular stability to travel through time. The Sixth Doctor puts himself into a telepathic trance to determine where his past incarnation is being held. He narrows it down to the Seville area, where the Sontaran spaceship landed.

Dastari reveals his plan to dissect the Second Doctor's cell structure to isolate his symbiotic nuclei and give them to Chessene. The Second Doctor protests that her barbaric Androgum nature, coupled with the ability to time travel, will mean that there will be no limit to her evil. Finding the hacienda, Peri interrupts the operation. Sneaking into the cellar, the Sixth Doctor examines the Kartz-Reimer module, a prototype time machine modelled on Time Lord technology, explaining to Jamie how it works. The Sontarans overhear him. Outside, Shockeye knocks Peri out and brings her to the hacienda kitchen. Stike threatens to kill Jamie unless the Sixth Doctor gets into the module and primes it with his symbiotic print, and the Doctor does so, after which, he and Jamie escape the Sontarans.

Chessene has a contingency plan after discovering the involvement of two Time Lords. She asks Dastari to implant the Second Doctor with some of Shockeye's genetic material, turning the Doctor into an Androgum. They also intend to eliminate the Sontarans.

Chessene interrupts Shockeye when he attempts to cook an unconscious Peri, and stuns him so that Dastari can remove his genetic material. The Sixth Doctor revives Peri, and tells Jamie and her that what he revealed to the Sontarans was not true — he had lied because he had heard Stike approaching. The machine worked for the Doctor, but will not for them because the Doctor has taken the  nebuliser. Before they can release the Second Doctor and escape the hacienda, Shockeye shows up with Peri. 

Dastari has implanted the Second Doctor with a 50 percent Androgum inheritance, and when Shockeye wakes in a rage, he finds a kindred spirit in the transformed Doctor. They decide to go into the town to sample the local cuisine. Dastari lures the Sontarans into the cellar, where Chessene attacks them. Varl is killed, but Stike manages to escape. He tries to use the module, but without the nebuliser, it severely burns him. Stike staggers towards his battlecraft, forgetting about the self-destruct Varl had set. The ship explodes.

The Sixth Doctor, Peri, and Jamie follow the Second Doctor into Seville, hoping to cure him before the change becomes complete. Dastari and Chessene are also looking for them, knowing that unless the Second Doctor undergoes a stabilising operation, he will eventually reject the Androgum transfusion. The Second Doctor and Shockeye go to Las Cadenas restaurant ordering gargantuan amounts of food. When the restaurant's owner Oscar demands that they pay, Shockeye fatally stabs Oscar, just as the Sixth Doctor and the others arrive. Shockeye leaves the Second Doctor, who slowly reverts to normal. As they leave the restaurant, Chessene and Dastari appear, taking them back to the hacienda at gunpoint.
 
Chessene and Dastari find the nebuliser on the module missing, and the Sixth Doctor tells them how he primed the machine for Stike. To test the truth of the Doctor's claim, they replace the nebuliser and send Peri on a trip with the module. The Sixth Doctor, however, confirms to the Second Doctor that the nebuliser is sabotaged, with a thin interface layer so it would work once, for Peri. The Sixth Doctor frees himself, and goes to save Jamie from being eaten by Shockeye in the kitchen. He encounters Shockeye in the kitchen, and the Androgum wounds him with a knife. Shockeye pursues him through the grounds. The Doctor ambushes Shockeye, covering his head with Oscar's butterfly net and pressing the cyanide-soaked cotton wool to his face, killing him.

Chessene sees the Doctor's blood and starts licking it. Dastari realises that no matter how augmented she may be, Chessene is still an Androgum, and decides to free the Second Doctor, Peri, and Jamie. When Chessene sees this, she shoots and kills Dastari. She tries to shoot the Second Doctor and Peri, but Jamie throws a knife at her wrist, making her drop the gun. Chessene goes into the module, hoping to escape, but the sabotaged module explodes, killing her.

The Second Doctor uses a Stattenheim remote control to summon his TARDIS. As the Sixth Doctor and Peri make their way back to their own TARDIS, the Doctor tells her that from now on, it will be a healthy vegetarian diet for both of them.

Production

Working titles for this story included The Kraglon Inheritance and The Androgum Inheritance. Robert Holmes, a vegetarian, wrote the serial as an allegory about meat-eating, hunting and butchering. "Androgum" is an anagram of "gourmand". Elements from Robert Holmes's aborted project The Six Doctors were carried over to this story (as the production subtitles for the DVD release reveal).

Holmes's original brief from producer John Nathan-Turner was to write a serial taking place in New Orleans, involving the Sontarans, the Second Doctor and Jamie, but the setting had to be changed to Spain instead when the expected funding for location filming in the United States fell through. Holmes was particularly disappointed that much of the humour involving the differences between Britain and America was lost in the rewrite. The only hint we get of this humour is in Episode 1, when the Sixth Doctor looks at Peri and says that Columbus "has a lot to answer for".

According to the DVD commentary track, location filming was plagued by numerous small problems, including high heat that caused make-up to melt, a three-day delay to replace Troughton and Pearce's wigs (which had somehow got lost in shipping), Carmen Gómez's refusal to wear a costume designed for her, and a local stunt man (the truck driver) who refused to perform his stunt as it had been choreographed. Pearce also says that she was a last-minute replacement for Elizabeth Spriggs, who had to drop out of the production. It was discovered that a filmed scene with Oscar and Anita in the olive grove had suffered by a scratch on the negative, so Saxon and Gómez, who had already returned to England, had to be quickly brought back to Spain at considerable expense. When the film was actually submitted for editing, however, it was discovered the scratch on the original negative wasn't noticeable on-screen, making the reshoot essentially pointless. This was the last of a number of stories in the "classic series" which included location filming outside the United Kingdom, starting with City of Death.

In his 1986 interview for Starburst, script editor Eric Saward said he thought this story was "poorly directed".

Cast notes
This story marked the final appearance of Patrick Troughton as the Second Doctor and the final on-screen appearance of Frazer Hines as Jamie.  The Second Doctor appearing much older in this feature, with noticeable grey hair, has been stated in novelizations and audio books as there having been a significant amount of time passing between The War Games (1969) and the Second Doctor's regeneration in Spearhead from Space (1970).

Broadcast and reception

The Two Doctors was one of several stories from this era to provoke controversy over its depiction of violence. In 1985, Australasian Doctor Who Fan Club president Tony Howe criticised the murder of Oscar with a kitchen knife as being an instance of "sick, shock violence" that was present for "cheap shock value only".

Patrick Mulkern of Radio Times awarded the serial two stars out of five, stating: "The Two Doctors wasn't dire, but the actors and audience deserved better." In Doctor Who: The Complete Guide, Mark Campbell awarded The Two Doctors seven out of ten, describing it as "a Doctor Who version of Last of the Summer Wine as sponsored by the Vegetarian Society."

Commercial releases

In print

The novelisation of this serial, by Robert Holmes, was published in hardback and paperback in August 1985 as the 100th Doctor Who release by Target Books. This was Holmes's only complete novelisation and seeks to clear up some of the continuity errors in the original broadcast. With a gold foil-embossed cover, it was billed on release as the 100th novelisation and featured an introduction by John Nathan-Turner.

Home media
The Two Doctors was released on VHS in November 1993. It was released on DVD in the UK in September 2003 in a two-disc set as part of the Doctor Who 40th Anniversary Celebration releases, representing the Colin Baker years, with many extra features, including the Jim'll Fix It sketch A Fix with Sontarans. The DVD contains a full-length commentary provided by director Peter Moffatt and actors Colin Baker, Nicola Bryant, Frazer Hines, and Jacqueline Pearce. The DVD was subsequently incorporated into the box set Bred for War, along with The Time Warrior, The Sontaran Experiment and The Invasion of Time. Following the sexual abuse accusations regarding Jimmy Savile, the DVD was withdrawn from sale but has since been rereleased with the offending sketch removed. The BBC has made the serial available for download on Apple iTunes. It was released in issue 45 of Doctor Who DVD Files.

Notes

References

External links

Target novelisation

Second Doctor serials
Sixth Doctor serials
Doctor Who multi-Doctor stories
1985 British television episodes
Doctor Who serials novelised by Robert Holmes
Doctor Who stories set on Earth
Fiction set in 1985
Television episodes set in Spain
Television shows set in Seville